True Justice, also known as Define True Colors, is a South Korean variety show that aired on MBC from December 18, 2014 to January 8, 2015. The show was also broadcast through MBC Plus Media’s four channels: MBC Every1, MBC Music, MBC Dramanet, and MBC Queen.

The show aimed to discuss the problems of the nation with a live audience who shared their views and opinions. By interacting with the audience, the cast tried to resolve the issues that the audience had expressed.

Cast
Kim Gura (김현동) - the oldest member of the show's cast, he often acted as the mediator to the discussions.
 Niel (니엘) - the youngest member of the cast, Niel was a hard worker and advocated for justice.
Sam Hammington (샘 해밍턴) 
Sam Okyere (샘 오취리)
Kim Bo-sung (김보성) - described as 'curious' and 'competitive' in his viewpoints. 
Kang Chul-woong (강철웅)
Yoon Hyung-bin (윤형빈)

List of episodes

References 

MBC TV original programming
South Korean variety television shows
2014 South Korean television series debuts